Anwar Hossain Helal is a politician from Naogaon District of Bangladesh. He was elected a member of parliament from Naogaon-6 in Oct 2020 by-election. He bagged 1,05,467 votes while BNP nominated candidate Sheikh Rezaul Islam got 4, 517 votes.

Birth and early life 
Anowar Hossain Helal was born on 12 July 1964 in Raninagar, Naogaon. His father is Azim Uddin Sardar. Anowar Hossain Helal has been nominated by the ruling Awami League in the by-election of Naogaon-6 (Raninagar-Atrai) constituency. He was the chairman of Raninagar Upazila Parishad. After receiving the nomination of Awami League, he resigned from the post of chairman. Helal was elected UP chairman once and chairman of the Upazila Parishad twice in his political career. He has been the vice president of Upazila Awami League since 2014. On 19 June 2000, his younger brother Nazrul Islam Naju, then president of Raninagar Upazila Chhatra League, was brutally slaughtered by the proletariat.

Career 
Anowar Hossain Helal is the co-president of Raninagar Upazila Awami League. He was the chairman of Raninagar Upazila Parishad for 2009-2014 and 2019-2020. In 2003, he was elected chairman of Khatteshwar Raninagar Union.

Israfil Alam, a Member of Parliament from Naogaon-6 constituency, died on 27 July 2020. He was elected a Member of Parliament in the by-election on 17 October 2020 in a vacant seat.

References 

Living people
1964 births
People from Naogaon District
Awami League politicians
11th Jatiya Sangsad members